Hot R&B/Hip-Hop Songs is a chart published by Billboard that ranks the top-performing songs in the United States in African-American-oriented musical genres; the chart has undergone various name changes since its launch in 1958 to reflect the evolution of such genres.  In 1988, the chart was published under the title Hot Black Singles.  During the year, 38 different singles topped the chart, based on playlists submitted by radio stations and surveys of retail sales outlets.

In the issue of Billboard dated January 7, Roberta Flack reached number one with "Oasis", her first appearance at the top of the chart since 1978.  The following week it was displaced by "Superwoman" by Karyn White, which spent three weeks in the top spot, the year's longest unbroken run at number one.  Surface had the most number ones during the year, topping the chart with "Closer Than Friends", "Shower Me with Your Love" and "You Are My Everything"; despite achieving three number ones in the space of less than nine months, the trio would only have one further chart-topper and by 1993 their chart career would be over.  Surface tied with White for the most weeks in the top spot; both acts spent five weeks atop the chart.  White was one of five acts to have two number ones in 1989, along with Bobby Brown, Soul II Soul, Stephanie Mills and Babyface.

Vanessa Williams, Surface, Today, De La Soul, Peabo Bryson, Soul II Soul featuring Caron Wheeler, Chuckii Booker, Babyface, Teddy Riley featuring Guy, Eric Gable, Regina Belle, and Miki Howard all reached number one for the first time during 1989, as did rapper Heavy D when he guested on "Just Coolin'" by LeVert.  "Tender Lover" by Babyface was the year's final chart-topper.  "Batdance" by Prince, taken from the soundtrack album of the film Batman, was the only single to top both the Black chart and Billboards all-genre chart, the Hot 100, during 1989.

Chart history

See also
1989 in music
List of number-one R&B albums of 1989 (U.S.)
List of Billboard Hot 100 number-one singles of 1989

References

Works cited

1989
1989 record charts
1989 in American music